Tazehkand (also Romanized as Tāzehkand) is a village in Chaybasar-e Sharqi Rural District, in the Central District of Poldasht County, West Azerbaijan Province, Iran. At the 2006 census, its population was 129, in 25 families.

References 

Populated places in Poldasht County